Meridarchis phaeodelta is a moth in the Carposinidae family. It is found in India and Sri Lanka.

References

Natural History Museum Lepidoptera generic names catalog

Carposinidae